The Left Hand of Eternity is a role-playing game adventure published by TSR in 1988 for the Marvel Super Heroes role-playing game.

Contents
The Left Hand of Eternity is a scenario for the Advanced rules, and is the last of the ME trilogy.

Publication history
ME3 The Left Hand of Eternity was written by Ray Winninger, and was published by TSR, Inc., in 1988 as a 48-page book and an outer folder.

Reception

Reviews

References

Marvel Comics role-playing game adventures
Role-playing game supplements introduced in 1988